Nicholas James Heath (born November 27, 1993) is an American professional baseball outfielder for the Chicago Dogs of the American Association of Professional Baseball. He previously played in Major League Baseball (MLB) for the Kansas City Royals and Arizona Diamondbacks.

Career
Heath attended Junction City High School in Junction City, Kansas. Undrafted out of high school, Heath attended Northwestern State University. He redshirted his freshman year and played the following three seasons of college baseball for the Demons (2014-2016). Heath was drafted by the Kansas City Royals in the 16th round, with the 493rd overall selection, of the 2016 MLB draft.

Kansas City Royals
Heath played for the Idaho Falls Chukars in 2016, hitting .291/.350/.387/.737 with 2 home runs, 28 RBI, and 36 stolen bases. He split the 2017 season between the Arizona Royals, Lexington Legends, and Wilmington Blue Rocks, hitting a combined .253/.316/.298/.614 with 1 home run, 16 RBI, and 25 stolen bases. Heath split the 2018 season between Wilmington and the Northwest Arkansas Naturals, hitting a combined .274/.376/.358/.734 with 2 home runs, 27 RBI, and 39 stolen bases. He played for the Surprise Saguaros of the Arizona Fall League following the 2018 season. He split the 2019 season between Northwest Arkansas and the Omaha Storm Chasers, hitting a combined .255/.345/.387/.732 with 8 home runs, 36 RBI, and 60 stolen bases.

Heath was added to the Royals 40–man roster following the 2019 season. He made his MLB debut on July 30, 2020 against the Detroit Tigers. Overall with the 2020 Kansas City Royals, Heath batted .154 with no home runs and 3 RBIs in 15 games.

On April 14, 2021, Heath was designated for assignment by the Royals.

Arizona Diamondbacks
On April 17, 2021, Heath was traded to the Arizona Diamondbacks in exchange for right-hander Eduardo Herrera. Heath hit .143/.231/.171 with no home runs and 1 RBI in 20 games for Arizona before he was designated for assignment on July 10. On July 14, Heath was assigned outright to the Triple-A Reno Aces. He was released on April 30, 2022.

Charleston Dirty Birds
On June 19, 2022, Heath signed with the Charleston Dirty Birds of the Atlantic League of Professional Baseball. Heath appeared in 77 games for Charleston, slashing .238/.358/.349 with 4 home runs, 33 RBI, and 42 stolen bases. He became a free agent following the season.

Chicago Dogs
On March 16, 2023, Heath signed with the Chicago Dogs of the American Association of Professional Baseball.

Personal life
Heath's mother, Kimberly Milleson, ran track at Kansas State University and was a U.S. Olympic trials participant.

In June 2020, Northwestern State created the Nick Heath Minority Scholarship which it announced would be awarded to three minority baseball players between ages 5 and 13 to cover the cost of enrollment at a school-sponsored youth baseball camp. Heath also announced that he would be donating a bat and custom glove to each recipient of the scholarship.

References

External links

Northwestern State Demons bio

1993 births
Living people
People from Junction City, Kansas
Baseball players from Kansas
Major League Baseball outfielders
Kansas City Royals players
Arizona Diamondbacks players
Northwestern State Demons baseball players
Idaho Falls Chukars players
Arizona League Royals players
Lexington Legends players
Wilmington Blue Rocks players
Northwest Arkansas Naturals players
Surprise Saguaros players
Omaha Storm Chasers players
Tigres del Licey players
American expatriate baseball players in the Dominican Republic